Otto VII may refer to:

 Otto VII, Margrave-elector of Brandenburg, known as Otto V, Duke of Bavaria
 Otto VII, Count of Tecklenburg

See also 
 Otto I (disambiguation)
 Otto II (disambiguation)
 Otto III (disambiguation)
 Otto IV (disambiguation)
 Otto V (disambiguation)
 Otto VI (1117–1183)
 Otto VIII (disambiguation)